Oru Viral Krishna Rao was an Indian actor and comedian who appeared in Tamil-language films. A recipient of the state government's Kalaimamani award, Rao got the nickname Oru Viral (one finger) for his first Tamil film in 1965. He acted in nearly 600 Tamil and Telugu films in a career spanning four decades.

Partial filmography

Television
 Vannakolangal (Episode: S S Mama) (1986)

Death
Krishna Rao died in a private hospital on Friday, August 16, 2002, a month after suffering a blood clot in his brain.

References

External links 
 

Tamil comedians
Date of birth missing
2002 deaths
1929 births
Place of birth missing
20th-century comedians
Male actors in Tamil cinema